Wasp Island is an island located in the Tasman Sea, in the South Coast region of New South Wales, Australia. It is the only island in Durras Inlet near Batemans Bay.

See also
List of islands of Australia

References

Islands of New South Wales